Gortler or Görtler may refer to:

People
Daniel Gortler, an Israeli pianist
Katherine Walker, née Katharina Görtler, a German-American lighthouse keeper
Lukas Görtler (born 1994), a German football player
Nicolas Görtler (born 1990), a German football player

Mathematics
Görtler vortices, a concept in fluid dynamics